Amargarh is a village in Bulandshahr District, Uttar Pradesh state of India. 202398 is pin code of this village.

References

Villages in Bulandshahr district